Bijapur, officially known as Vijayapura, is the district headquarters of Bijapur district of the Karnataka state of India. It is also the headquarters for Bijapur Taluk. Bijapur city is well known for its historical monuments of architectural importance built during the rule of the Adil Shahi dynasty. It is also well known for the sports by the popular Karnataka premier league team as Bijapur Bulls.

The city was established in the 10th–11th centuries by the Kalyani Chalukyas and was known as Vijayapura (city of victory). The city was passed to Yadavas after Chalukya's demise. In 1347, the area was conquered by the Bahmani Sultanate. After the split of the Bahmani Sultanate, the Bijapur Sultanate ruled from the city. Relics of the Sultanates' rule can be found in the city, including the Bijapur Fort, Bara Kaman, Jama Masjid, and Gol Gumbaz.

Bijapur, one of the popular heritage city located in the Karnataka state of India, is also one of the top ten populated cities in Karnataka. The Bijapur city has been declared as one of the corporations in the state of Karnataka in 2013. Bijapur urban population as per 2011 census is 326,000, perhaps the 9th biggest city in Karnataka. Vijayapura Mahanagara Palike (VMP) is the newest Municipal Corporation formed under the KMC act along with Shimoga and Tumkur Municipal Corporations. Administratively, Bijapur district comes under Belgaum division along with Bagalkote, Belgaum, Dharwad, Gadag, Haveri and Uttara Kannada (Karwar) districts. The civic administration of the city is managed by the Bijapur City Corporation and office of Deputy Commissioner in Bijapur. The office of Deputy Commissioner has the responsibility of rural areas in Bijapur, while the corporation administrates the city of Bijapur. Effective administration of the heritage city of Bijapur is the main intention behind all the activities of Vijayapura City Corporation.

History

Early history 
The Bijapur district is historically, traditionally and legendarily, one of the richest districts in the state. The evidence found here reveals that it was an inhabited place since the Stone Age. The history of this district is divided into four periods, from the Chalukya acquisition of Badami till the Muslim invasion.

Early Western Chalukya period lasting from about A.D. 535 to about A.D.757. Rastrakuta period from A.D. 757 to A.D.973. Kalachuri and Hoysala period from A.D. 973 to about A.D.1200. Devagiri Yadava period from A.D.1185 to the Muslim conquest of Devagiri in A.D. 1312.

Bahmani and Bijapur Sultanates 

Bijapur first came under the influence of Allaudin Khalji, the Sultan of Delhi, towards the end of the 13th century, and then under the Bahamani kings of Bidar in 1347. In 1347, when the Bahamani dynasty was established, it included southern and eastern parts of Bijapur district. The supremacy of the Bahaman's may be said to have ceased by 1489. At that time five Shahi Dynasties were born and one of them was "Bijapur". The Mughal emperor Aurangazeb conquered Bijapur in 1686 and it was under Mughal rule up to 1723. In 1724 the Nizam of Hyderabad State established his independence in the Deccan and included Bijapur within his dominion. However, his acquisition on this portion was of brief duration, in 1760 it went into the hands of Marathas.

In 1518, the Bahmani Sultanate split into five splinter states known as the Deccan sultanates, one of which was Bijapur, ruled by the kings of the Adil Shahi dynasty (1490–1686). The city of Bijapur owes much of its greatness to Yusuf Adil Shah, the founder of the independent state of Bijapur.

The rule of this dynasty ended in 1686, when Bijapur was conquered during the reign of Mughal badshah (emperor) Aurangzeb, who had in 1684 turned Bijapur into a subah (imperial top-level province).

British Colonial period 
In 1724 the Nizam of Hyderabad established his independence in the Deccan, and included Bijapur within his dominions. In 1760, the Nizam suffered a defeat by the Marathas, and ceded the region of Bijapur to the Maratha Peshwa.

After the 1818 defeat of the Peshwa by the British in the Third Anglo-Maratha War, Bijapur passed into the hands of the British East India Company, and was assigned to the Maratha princely state Satara.

In 1817, war broke out between the British and the Marathas. By 1818, the whole of Bijapur was occupied by the British and was included in the territory assigned to the Raja of Satara. In 1848 the territory of Satara was obtained through the failure of heir and the British rule started. Till 1884, the Bijapur district had headquarters at Kaladagi. Bijapur was made headquarters in 1885.

Post-Independence 
After Independence, the movement for re-organisation of States gained further momentum and on 1 November 1956 a separate "Mysore State" was formed. By the wish of the people it was renamed as "Karnataka". Thus, the district Bijapur along with other Kannada speaking areas became a part of "Karnataka State" on 1 November 1956.

Central government had approved the request to rename the city in October 2014 from Bijapur to "Vijayapura" on 1 November 2014.

Geography 
Bijapur is located 140 km from Sangli, 212 km from Belagavi and 349 km from Pune. Bijapur has a semi-arid climate. It has an average elevation of 606 metres (1988 ft). The district has two types of soil. First one is, "deep black soil" (or yeari bhoomi), which is good for the crops like jawar, wheat, pulses, sunflower, etc. The major portion of the district consists of this kind of soil which has a great moisture-holding capacity. Second one is "red soil‟ (or masari /maddi bhoomi), which is generally poor, good for irrigation and horticulture. Krishna river, which is the most important river of the district. It flows about 125 miles in the district. A dam is built across the river at Almatti, Bhima river flows in northern part of district for about 20 miles. It overflows in the rainy season and spreads over a wider area, which is thereby rendered extremely fertile land. In central part of district Doni river flows.

Climate and temperature
The climate of Bijapur district is generally dry and healthy. In summer, especially in April and May, it is too hot; at that time the temperature lays between 40-degrees Celsius to 42-degrees Celsius. In the winter season, from November to January, the temperature is between 15-degrees Celsius to 20-degrees Celsius. Usually the district has dry weather, so the humidity varies from 10% to 30%. The district has 34 rain gauge stations. The average annual rainfall for the whole district is 552.8 mm, with 37.2 rainy days. The monsoon generally reaches the district by June and lasts till October. Though the total rainfall is not high, the district benefits both from the south-west and the north-east monsoons. The annual rainfall varies from place to place within the district.

Description
The city consists of three distinct portions: the citadel, the fort and the remains of the city. The fort, which was completed by the Adilshahi Sultans in 1566, is surrounded by a wall 6 m. in circumference. In addition there are ten others at the various gateways. The whole is surrounded by a deep moat 30 to  broad. Inside these walls the Bijapur kings bade defiance to all comers. Outside the walls are the remains of a vast city, now for the most part in ruins, but the innumerable tombs, mosques, which have resisted the havoc of time, afford abundant evidence of the ancient splendor of the place.
Badami, Aihole, and Pattadakal, near Bijapur, are noted for their historical temples in the Chalukya architectural style.

It lies between latitude 15.20 and 17.28 north and longitude 74.59 and 76.28 east. It is situated well in the interior of the Deccan Peninsula and is about 130 miles away from the west coast.

The district is bounded by Solapur district to the north and Sangli district to the north-west, Belgaum district on the west, Bagalkot district to the south, Gulbarga district to the east and Koppal district to the south-east.

About the city

The Gadag–Solapur railway line traverses via this place. The Kalyani Chalukya kings made it a sub-capital according to an inscription of 1073. It is believed that Jain Poet Nagachandra, 12th century, had his residence here. The place had old names like Vijayapura, Vidyapura and Mohamudpura. For nearly 200 years from 1489 to 1686, this was the seat of the Adilshahi dynasty.
 Among the other historical attractions at Bijapur, some notable ones are the Anand Mahal, Jod Gumbaz, Jumma Masjid, Saat Manzil, and Jal Manzil. also among old houses at Bijapur, the most famous is Elavia House (Nauzer Elavia) which is more than 100 years old.
 Bijapur City was also held by Aurangzeb, the Nizam, Savanur Nawab, Satara Chatrapati and finally the British. Foreign travellers like Duarte Barbosa, Varthema, Poser, Mandeslo and Travernier visited this place.
 The Ibrahim Rouza and the Gol Gumbaz are the most impressive monuments at Bijapur. A brief survey of spots of note in the city is given below.
 Ain-ul-mulk's tomb and mosque Lies on the eastern outskirts of the city and is the solid structure in square, surrounded by a fair proportioned dome. The tomb belongs to Ain-ul-mulk. Close by this the much adorned mosque and the building is plastered.
 Ali Adil Shah I's tomb lies in the south-west part of the city. Ali Adilshah's Tomb is a simple modest building containing an outer row of five arches surrounding a central chamber and is the earliest royal mausoleum in Bijapur.
 Ali Adil Sha II's tomb is located to the north-west of the citadel, and is housed in a big square roofless structure consisting of incomplete arches in dark basalt. This incomplete structure is  square and on the raised platform stand the incomplete arches. In the centre on the elevated platform are the tombs.
 Ali Shahi Pir's mosque and tomb is a square massive structure, its mihrab is remarkable in some ways. The tomb of the saint is outside the north-east gate of the mosque.
The tomb of Khwaja Amin-ud-din is on the high ground and conspicuous landmark for considerable distance round about.
 Anand Mahal is to the west of Gagan Mahal and in the premises of the citadel stands this two-storeyed mansion. This was constructed by Ibrahim Adil Sha II in 1589, exclusively for music and dance. The roof was ornamented with stucco work. The Ananda Mahal presently is being used by the State for Government offices.
 Andu Masjid stands a little away from the citadel to the west of the Jumanal road. It is a two-storeyed structure, upper floor being a prayer chamber while the ground is a hall. There is no pulpit in the mosque and probably it was restricted to the prayer of women. A Persian inscription here quotes that the mosque was constructed in 1608 by Itbar Khan, one of the nobles in the Court of Adil Shai II.
 Aras Mahal Is to the south-east of Adalat Mahal and was once a joy resort of Ali II. It is now the residence of the District Surgeon.
 Ark-Killa the citadel is at the centre of the city. It is also most important part of Bijapur. Yusuf Adilshah chose it as the site for his fort. The present citadel is nearly circular. Its defences are a strong wall with several bastions of considerable strength on the south and east.
 Asar Mahal on the crest of the eastern glacis of the citadel is the Asar Mahal. In about 1646 it was constructed by Muhammad Shah and was earlier called as Adalat Mahal. The walls and ceilings of the rooms bear paintings of landscapes and various designs. The room of the south side of the gilded hall is a gorgeously painted apartment. These paintings had been whitewashed by the orders of Aurangzeb and later restored. There is a big square tank outside in front of the building.
 Aurangzeb Idgah Is a large square enclosure built by Aurangzeb in 1682 after the occupation of the city as a gathering place for Muslims on important days.
 Bukhari Masjid is believed to have been constructed by Chandbibi for a moulvi of the Bukhari family. On the door of the Masjid there is a Persian Inscription.
 Chand Bavadi is a well constructed by Ali Adil Shah I in honour of his wife Chand Bibi in the year 1579. It is at the west corner of the town. The entrance is spanned by a single arch, approached by a descending flight of steps.
 Chota Asar is a small building, remarkable for the amount of rich ornamentation in stucco which covers the wall, ceiling and a portion of the façade.
 Chini Mahal or Faroukh Mahal is an edifice that consists of a big lofty durbar hall in the centre and series of rooms in the wings. Yusuf Adil Shah constructed it. For its sheer size and loftiness none of the hall in any other palace of Bijapur can be compared with it.

Sufis of Bijapur 

Arrival of Sufis in the  Bijapur region was started during the reign of Qutbuddin Aibak. During this period Deccan was under the control of native Hindu rulers and Palegars. Shaikh Haji Roomi was the first to arrive in Bijapur with his companions. Although his other comrades like Shaikh Salahuddin, Shaikh Saiful Mulk and Syed Haji Makki were settled in Pune, Haidra and Tikota respectively.

According to Tazkiraye Auliyae Dakkan i.e., Biographies of the saints of the Deccan, compiled by Abdul Jabbar Mulkapuri in 1912–1913, 

After this period arrival of Sufis in Bijapur and suburbs was started. Ainuddin Gahjul Ilm Dehelvi narrates that Ibrahim Sangane was one of the early Sufis of Bijapur parish.  Sufis of Bijapur can be divided into three categories according to period of their arrival viz., Sufis before Bahmani and / or Adil Shahi Dynasty, Sufis during Adil Shahi Dynasty and Sufis after the fall of Adil Shahi Dynasty. And further it can be classified as Sufis as warriors, Sufis as social reformers, Sufis as scholars, poets and writers.

Ibrahim Zubairi writes in his book Rouzatul Auliyae Beejapore (compiled during 1895) which describes that more than 30 tombs or Dargahs are there in Bijapur with more than 300 Khankahs  i.e., Islamic Missionary Schools with notable number of disciples of different lineage like Hasani Sadat, Husaini Sadat, Razavi Sadat, Kazmi Sadat, Shaikh Siddiquis, Farooquis, Usmanis, Alvis, Abbasees  and other and spiritual chains like Quadari, Chishti, Suharwardi, Naqshbandi, Shuttari, Haidari  etc.

Demographics 

Bijapur City had a population of 326,360 population as per census 2011. Males constitute 51% of the population and females 49%. Bijapur has an effective literacy rate of 83.43%, higher than the national average of 74%; with male literacy of 88.92% and female literacy of 77.86%. 12% of the population is under 6 years of age. Kannada is the major language spoken here.

At the time of the 2011 census, 51.43% of the population spoke Kannada, 34.35% Urdu, 5.38% Marathi, 3.85% Lambadi, 2.01% Hindi and 1.17% Telugu as their first language.

Transport 
Roadways
Roadways: geographically & strategically well connected through major cities by four lane NH-13(Solapur–Mangalore) (now NH50), NH-218 (Hubli–Humnabad) and other state highways. The main stand in Bijapur is near the southwestern side of the citadel, near the city center. Bus services to Badami, Belgaum, Almatti, Gulbarga, Bidar, Hubli and Solapur are frequent.
Bijapur is geographically & strategically well connected through major cities by four lane NH 13(Solapur–Mangalore) (now NH50), NH-218 (Hubli–Humnabad) and other state highways.
Bijapur is a big road transport hub and its state run bus transport division has 6 depots/units and comes under Kalyana Karnataka Road Transport Corporation (KKRTC) headquartered at Gulbarga.
The division plys many premium multi-axle coaches, sleeper coach, sitting push back coach with AC and Non AC with makers like Volvo, Mercedes Benz, Isuzu Tata Motors, Ashok Leyland, Mitsubishi etc. services to Bangalore, Mumbai, Pune, Hyderabad, Mangalore, Mysore, Hubli, Belgaum and other major cities.

Railways
Bijapur is well connected by rail with Bangalore and other major cities of India (Mumbai, Hyderabad, Ahmedabad, Hubli and Solapur). It has its own railhead that is located just  from the main town.

Bijapur railway station is connected by a broad-gauge railway (Gadag–Hotgi railway line) to Hotgi Junction near Solapur railway station and Kurduvadi railway station on Central Railway towards the north and to Bagalkote and Gadag junction on South Western Railway towards the south. Bijapur is connected with direct trains to Solapur, Bagalkote, Gadag, Dharwad, Ballari, Yeswanthpur (Bangalore), Hubli, Mumbai, Hyderabad and Ahmedabad. Bijapur comes under Hubli division of South Western Railway (SWR)

Direct railway line to Gulbarga and Belgaum

Bijapur–Shahabad is a proposed new railway line (via Devar Hippargi, Sindgi, Jewargi) and was sanctioned in the state budget of 2010–11.

Bijapur–Shedbal is a proposed new railway line (via Tikota, Athani, Shedbal) survey has been completed and submitted to South Western Railway Hubli

GoK's intention is to develop Bijapur - Gulbarga belt as a cement & steel hub, which has created a need for a direct railway line between Bijapur and Shahabad.  This would also be able to carry coal from the Jharkhand and Singareni collieries for NTPC's 4000 MW Power Project in Kudagi (Basavana Bagewadi Taluk). The Bijapur–Shahabad line would run  and be under the South Western Railway. Partial private sector financing is required; however, state government will contribute two-thirds of the project cost of the railway line, which is estimated at Rs. 12 billion over the first five years, in a role as an investor in return for a share in the profits.

Similar proposal has been made for sugar belt on the Bijapur Athani Belgaum new line, which will also provide shorter connectivity from Goa to Solapur, Gulbarga, Bidar, Nagpur, Kolkata. The line would run  and be under South Western Railway, if project is taken into consideration it will be on 50:50 cost sharing basis on both state and railways

Air Transport
The nearest airport is at Gulbarga (152 km). Many airlines connect Bijapur to the rest of India via this airport. A greenfield airport which can accommodate ATR 72 & Airbus 320 (expansion afterwards) is currently being built by Karnataka government. Land has already been acquired. Bijapur Airport will be built  by the Karnataka State Industrial and Infrastructure Development Corporation (KSIIDC) at a cost of Rs 220 crore. The construcion has strarted and airport is expected to be ready by early 2022.

Education
Bijapur is emerging as a hub for professional education. Previously (i.e. before the 1980s) there were very few professional educational institutions. Along with the professional colleges there are many colleges which provide under-graduate and post-graduate degrees in the faculty of applied science, pure science, social-sciences and humanities.
College of Agriculture, Bijapur, Hittinalli Farm affiliated university of Agricultural Sciences, Dharwad is one of the leading educational and research institutes in the field of agriculture, which is offering undergraduate and postgraduate courses in various disciplines of agriculture.

Engineering colleges are affiliated to Visvesvaraya Technological University viz, B.L.D.E.A's V.P. Dr. P.G. Halakatti College of Engineering and Technology and SECAB College of Engineering and Technology

Al Ameen Medical college is affiliated to Rajiv Gandhi University of Health Sciences. BLDEA's B.M.Patil Medical College, Hospital and Research Centre is a deemed university recognised by UGC.  Other professional colleges run by BLDE Association are BLDEA's college of pharmacy and college of Nursing sciences affiliated to RGUHS.

Many of colleges except professional are affiliated to Rani Chennamma University Belgaum viz, B.L.D.E.A'S A.S.PATIL COLLEGE OF COMMERCE(Autonomous)MBA Programme, Bijapur. Rani Chennamma University has a Post-Graduation Centre at Bijapur also.

First women's university in the state of Karnataka is located at Bijapur. Various post-graduate courses like MBA, MCA are conducted here. Bijapur also has BLDE (Deemed to be University, a deemed University of health sciences recognized by UGC.  Additionally Bijapur has the first Sainik School in the state, the second being in Kodagu. This is a very reputed residential school preparing cadets for the Defence forces and grooming students very well in many fields. And there many private computer training institutes providing computer education.

The Bijapur district is known for its mosques, structural monuments, art and architectural heritages, archaeological sites and cave temples. With the objective to spread education in this area, Karnatak University opened its Post-Graduate Centre in 1993.

Karnataka State Women's University
Karnataka State Women's University, established in 2003 in the city of Bijapur is the only Women's University in Karnataka dedicated exclusively for women's education. It is recognised under 2(f) and 12(B) of the UGC Act. Seventy women's colleges spread in twelve districts of North-Karnataka are affiliated to this University. The University offers various UG programmes leading to bachelor's degree in Arts, Business Administration, Computer Applications, Commerce, Education, Fashion Technology, Home Science, Physical Education, Science and Social Work. It also offers 20 P G Courses, P G Diploma and Certificate Courses in the Faculties of Arts, Commerce and Management, Social Sciences, Science and Technology and Education.

IGNOU Bijapur Regional Center 
Bijapur has IGNOU regional center, There are 7 districts under its jurisdiction (Districts Bagalkote, Bijapur, Bidar, Gulbarga, Koppal, Raichur and Yadagiri). The newly created Bijapur Regional Centre would cater to seven northern districts.
 Bijapur IGNOU Regional Center

Sports

Cricket
At the inaugural auction of Karnataka Premier League (KPL), Bijapur Bulls was one of the eight teams that were formed. Bijapur Bulls represent the Gulbarga zone of Karnataka State.

Women's international cricket player Rajeshwari Gayakwad is from Bijapur.

Cycling
Bijapur is well known for its cycling culture. Cyclists from the city have won numerous accolades including medals in the State Mini Olympics.

See also
 List of rulers of Bijapur
 Bhāskara II
 Lakkundi
 Arakeri, Bijapur
 Sabala Organization
 List of people from Bijapur

References

Sources
 "Samanya Mahiti"a periodical released by the Bijapur Zilla Parishad.
Karnataka State Gazetteer 1983. 
 Unsung kings Bijapur

External links

 
Bejapore, by Samuel Prout, engraved by J Teavons.
Taj Bowlee, Bejapore, by Samuel Prout, engraved by J Redaway.
Mosque of Mustapha Khan, Beejapore, by William Purser, engraved by Edward Francis Finden.
Tomb of Ibrahim Padshah, Bejapore, by Thomas Allom, engraved by Thomas Higham.

 
Former capital cities in India
Tourism in Karnataka
Cities in Karnataka